Sadabad (also Romanized as Sa‘dābād) is a village in Garakan Rural District, in the Central District of Ashtian County, Markazi Province, Iran. At the 2006 census, its population was 65, in 15 families.

References 

Populated places in Ashtian County